Butkų Juzė (July 21, 1893 – April 22, 1947) was the pen name of Juozas Butkus, a Lithuanian educator, poet, playwright and journalist. He worked for numerous newspapers from 1910 onwards, including Aušrinė, Žemaitis, Lietuvos žinios, and Naujojoje Lietuvoje. In 1932 he was inducted into the Lithuanian Journalists' Union. He wrote the play Palaidūnas (Prodigal) in 1925, and translated numerous works into Lithuanian, including Goethe's Egmont. He later worked as a museum curator and teacher at the Klaipėda Pedagogical Institute.

References

Lithuanian educators
Lithuanian male poets
Lithuanian journalists
Lithuanian dramatists and playwrights
1893 births
1947 deaths
Male journalists
Male dramatists and playwrights
Lithuanian translators
20th-century poets
20th-century dramatists and playwrights
20th-century translators
People from Telšiai County
University of Jena alumni
20th-century male writers
Translators of Johann Wolfgang von Goethe
20th-century journalists